Junie Sng Poh Leng,  (born 6 June 1964) is a former Singaporean swimmer. She was a three-time double winner of the SNOC Sportswoman of the Year and the Sportsgirl of the Year awards in 1978, 1979 and 1980. Sng was awarded the Public Service Star for her contributions to sports in 1982. She was ranked seventh in a list of Singapore's 50 Greatest Athletes of the Century by The Straits Times in 1999.

At the age of 11, Sng first represented Singapore at the 1975 Southeast Asian Peninsular Games, where she won a gold and silver medal. In March 1977, she set a national record with a time of 4:39.9 in the 400-meter freestyle. At the 1977 Southeast Asian Games in November, Sng won five gold medals and a silver as she broke six meet and two Asian Games records.

Sng became the first female swimmer to win gold for Singapore and the youngest gold medalist in a women's event in Asian Games history when she set a new Games record time of 4:31.35 in the 400-meter freestyle on 14 December 1978. A day later, she broke the Games record with a time of 9:18.33 in the 800-meter freestyle to clinch another gold medal. Sng finished the 1978 Games with two gold and one silver medal.

At the 1979 Southeast Asian Games, Sng broke three games and three national records on her way to claiming five golds, two silvers and a bronze. Sng won seven gold medals at the 1981 Games.

The 1983 Southeast Asian Games held in Singapore was Sng's final competition before she retired at her peak. She broke the nine-minute barrier, clocking an Asian record time of 8:59.46 in the 800-meter freestyle as she won a total of ten gold medals.

Sng and her family emigrated in Melbourne, Australia after she retired from swimming to focus on her university studies. She graduated with an applied science degree from the Queensland University of Technology in 1987. As of 2014, Sng is working as an IT specialist. She has two sons, Zachary and Sebastien, with her husband, Geoff Holden.

References

External links 
 
 

1964 births
Living people
Singaporean female freestyle swimmers
Singaporean people of Chinese descent
Asian Games medalists in swimming
Swimmers at the 1978 Asian Games
Medalists at the 1978 Asian Games
Singaporean emigrants to Australia
Queensland University of Technology alumni
Recipients of the Bintang Bakti Masyarakat
Asian Games gold medalists for Singapore
Asian Games silver medalists for Singapore
Southeast Asian Games medalists in swimming
Southeast Asian Games gold medalists for Singapore
Southeast Asian Games silver medalists for Singapore
Competitors at the 1975 Southeast Asian Peninsular Games
Competitors at the 1977 Southeast Asian Games
Competitors at the 1979 Southeast Asian Games
Competitors at the 1981 Southeast Asian Games
Competitors at the 1983 Southeast Asian Games
20th-century Singaporean women